Avarus are a band from Tampere, Finland. They were formed in 2001 by members of The Anaksimandros and Pylon and soon absorbed members of other Finnish bands such as Kiila, Munuaissymposium 1960, Kemialliset Ystävät and solo performer Lau Nau. Avarus' floating line-up varies between 10 and 20 members. 

Avarus are considered a key element in the Finnish psychedelic folk scene which emerged in the early 2000s.

Discography
Horuksen Keskimmäisen Silmän Mysteerikoulu CD-R (Lal Lal Lal, 2001)
Posum Ekor Kait Dataran 3" CD-R (Lal Lal Lal, 2001)
Luonnon ilmiöitä 7" (Boing Being, 2002)
III LP (HP Cycle Records, 2002)
A-V-P CD-R (267 Lattajjaa, 2003)
Kimi on tintti CS (Lal Lal Lal, 2004)
Vaahtera Jäniksen Hännänkieliset Seikkailut 7" (Gold Soundz, 2004)
Jättiläisrotta CD (Secret Eye, 2005)
Ruskeatimantti dbl-CD (tUMULt, 2005)
II LP (HP Cycle Records, 2006)
Vesikansi CD (Secret Eye, 2006)
Rasvaaja LP (Secret Eye, 2007)
Kirppujen saari LP (Arbor, 2008)
IV LP (Secret Eye / Ikuisuus, 2009)
Toosassa LP (Ultra Eczema, 2009)

External links
Profile at Secret Eye
Profile at Lost Frog
[ AMG profile]

Finnish musical groups
Tumult Records artists